Sir Philip Martin Bailhache KC  is a Jersey politician and lawyer who has served as a Deputy for St Clement since 2022 and the leader of the Jersey Liberal Conservatives party.

He served as Bailiff of Jersey from 1995 to 2009, before entering the States Assembly in 2011 as a Senator, serving as Jersey’s first Minister for External Relations from 2013 until he stood down from the States Assembly in 2018. He previously served as Deputy for Grouville from 1972 until 1975, before serving successively as Solicitor General, Attorney General and Deputy Bailiff between 1975 and 1995.

Early years and family 
Bailhache was born in Jersey and was educated at St. Michael's Preparatory School and Charterhouse School, England.

His grandfather was a Jersey solicitor and served as Deputy for Grouville. His father was Lester Vivian Bailhache MA (1910–2005), a barrister called to the English Bar and an advocate in Jersey, he was Deputy of St Clement and subsequently a Jurat of the Royal Court of Jersey who served as Lieutenant-Bailiff of Jersey 1980–1982.

Bailhache read Law at the University of Oxford, was called to the English Bar in 1968 and the Jersey Bar in 1969. He practised from the family law firm, Bailhache and Bailhache in Hill Street, St Helier.

His brother, William Bailhache, was appointed HM Attorney General in 2000 and Deputy Bailiff in 2009, and he was sworn in as Bailiff on 29 February 2015.

Legal career

Law Officer 1975–1993 
Bailhache served as a Law Officer of the Crown for 19 years, first as HM Solicitor General (1975–1985) and subsequently as HM Attorney General (1986–1993).

Deputy Bailiff and Bailiff 1994–2011 
In 1994, Bailhache became Deputy Bailiff of Jersey, following the controversial removal from office of the previous Deputy Bailiff Vernon Tomes. He was appointed Bailiff of Jersey in 1995, in succession to Sir Peter Crill. As Deputy Bailiff and Bailiff, he was an ex officio judge of the Court of Appeal of Jersey. He was a judge of the Court of Appeal of Guernsey from 1995 to 2009.

Bailhache introduced several modernisations to Jersey's legal system. In 1997, he was the founding editor of the Jersey Law Review (from 2007 the Jersey and Guernsey Law Review). In 1998, he led the setting up and became the first chairman of the Jersey Legal Information Board, a project designed to use technologies to streamline the administration of justice and make Jersey court judgments more easily accessible as part of the worldwide free access to law movement. In 2008, he became the first chairman of the Governing Body of Jersey's law school, the Institute of Law, a not-for-profit organisation providing courses for candidates sitting the Jersey advocates and solicitors examinations and students taking the University of London LLB degree via the International Programmes.

In July 2005, the Policy and Resources Committee of the States of Jersey established the Constitutional Review Group, with terms of reference 'to conduct a review and evaluation of the potential advantages and disadvantages for Jersey in seeking independence from the United Kingdom or other incremental change in the constitutional relationship, while retaining the Queen as Head of State'. Bailhache was invited to chair the Group, which produced a 'Second Interim Report' in December 2007, presented to the States by the Council of Ministers in June 2008.

Bailhache retired from the office of Bailiff at the end of June 2009 and was succeeded by Mr Michael Birt. He continued to sit as a Commissioner (part-time judge) of the Royal Court of Jersey until July 2011.

Bailhache is an active member of the Commonwealth Magistrates and Judges' Association and became the Executive Vice-President in September 2009, following the retirement of Sir Henry Brooke.

Comments by Bailhache in his May 2008 Liberation Day speech about reporting by the international news media of investigations of child abuse on the island were criticised, but maintained as justified by Bailhache. On 15 July 2008, the States of Jersey Assembly overwhelmingly rejected a vote of no-confidence brought by Jersey Democratic Alliance member Deputy Shona Pitman, by 47 votes to 3.

Political career 
Bailhache was elected to the States of Jersey as deputy of Grouville in 1972, resigning his seat in 1975 on his appointment as Solicitor General.

In 2009, Bailhache and his wife were among prominent islanders to give public support to a campaign to introduce civil partnerships for gay people in Jersey. For many years, Bailhache has promoted reconciliation between the peoples of Jersey and Germany, especially in Bad Wurzach, where many islanders were interned during the Second World War.

In written evidence to Lord Carswell's 2010 inquiry into reform of Jersey's Crown Officers, including the role of the Bailiff, Bailhache concluded that "the current system works extremely well and there is no reason for change".

In July 2011, he announced that he was standing in the elections for the four vacant Senatorial seats in Jersey's October 2011 general election. He came top of the poll, receiving 17,538 votes (80.2% of votes cast). He subsequently stood for election to the post of Chief Minister, but was defeated by 27 votes to 24 by Ian Gorst on 14 November 2011.

Bailhache has called for changes to the Channel Islands' relationship with the United Kingdom government, arguing that "at the very least, we should be ready for independence if we are placed in a position where that course was the only sensible option".

On 7 March 2012, the States appointed Bailhache as chairman of Jersey's Electoral Commission. The Electoral Commission was set up to examine the constitution of the States Assembly.

On 24 June 2021, Bailhache announced he would launch a new political party called the Jersey Liberal Conservatives.

The JLC garnered sufficient support to field candidates in the 2022 Jersey general election, and entered into a coalition with the Progress Party.

Honours 
In 1989 he became one of the first two Queen's Counsel learned in the law of Jersey. He received a knighthood in the 1996 Birthday Honours. In 2006, he was awarded l'Ordre de la Pléiade (Grand Officier class) by l'Assemblée parlementaire de la Francophonie. He is an honorary fellow of Pembroke College, Oxford (elected 1995) and an Honorary Bencher of the Middle Temple (2003).

See also 
 List of foreign ministers in 2017
 List of current foreign ministers

References

Living people
1946 births
People educated at Charterhouse School
Alumni of Pembroke College, Oxford
Bailiffs of Jersey
Knights Bachelor
Jersey law
Deputies of Jersey
Senators of Jersey
Jersey lawyers
Politicians awarded knighthoods
Lawyers awarded knighthoods